Thomas Wisman is an Australian-American basketball coach and a former player. He was head coach of the national teams of England, Hong Kong, Malaysia, Japan and Qatar.

He won the 1995 NBL Coach of the Year Award while coaching Newcastle Falcons of the National Basketball League in Australia.

He won the championship of the 2009-10 Japanese Basketball League as head coach of Link Tochigi Brex.

Head coaching record

|- 
| style="text-align:left;"|Link Tochigi Brex
| style="text-align:left;"|2008-09
| 25||13||12|||| style="text-align:center;"|5th|||-||-||-||
| style="text-align:center;"|-
|-
|- style="background:#FDE910;"
| style="text-align:left;"|Link Tochigi Brex
| style="text-align:left;"|2009-10
| 42||27||15|||| style="text-align:center;"|2nd|||6||5||1||
| style="text-align:center;"|JBL Champions
|- 
| style="text-align:left;"|Link Tochigi Brex
| style="text-align:left;"|2014-15
| 54||43||11|||| style="text-align:center;"|2nd in Easten|||4||2||2||
| style="text-align:center;"|3rd
|- 
| style="text-align:left;"|Link Tochigi Brex
| style="text-align:left;"|2015-16
| 54||43||11|||| style="text-align:center;"|2nd|||5||3||2||
| style="text-align:center;"|3rd
|-
|- style="background:#FDE910;" 
| style="text-align:left;"|Link Tochigi Brex
| style="text-align:left;"|2016-17
| 60||46||14|||| style="text-align:center;"|1st in Eastern|||6||5||1||
| style="text-align:center;"|Champions
|- 
| style="text-align:left;"|Yokohama B-Corsairs
| style="text-align:left;"|2018-19
| 60||14||46|||| style="text-align:center;"|6th in Central|||-||-||-||
| style="text-align:center;"|-
|- 
| style="text-align:left;"|Yokohama B-Corsairs
| style="text-align:left;"|2019-20
| 32||8||24|||| style="text-align:center;"|Fired|||-||-||-||
| style="text-align:center;"|-
|-

References

1949 births
Living people
American men's basketball coaches
Australian men's basketball coaches
Japan national basketball team coaches
Utsunomiya Brex coaches
National Basketball League (Australia) coaches
Wonju DB Promy coaches
Yokohama B-Corsairs coaches